The 2022 Formula D season (officially titled Formula Drift Pro Championship) was the nineteenth season of the Formula D series. The series began on April 2 at Long Beach and concluded on October 15 at Irwindale Speedway after eight events. Fredric Aasbø won the championship, becoming the third three-time champion in Formula Drift history. Matt Field finished runner-up to Aasbø for the second consecutive year, with a highly consistent campaign that saw him reach the Final Four in each of the first six rounds. The eight-round season saw an unprecedented seven different winners, including three first-time winners in Dylan Hughes, Travis Reeder and Kazuya Taguchi. The only driver to score multiple victories during the season was Aasbø.

Entries
For 2022, Formula Drift imposed a limit of 37 drivers that could be awarded a full-season entry. Forrest Wang attempted to return to the series, having last competed in 2019 before taking a break from competition to raise a family. However, his two-year absence meant he no longer had priority status for a full-season entry, and his admission was not accepted.

Schedule

Championship standings

Scoring system
During qualifying, drivers perform solo runs which are judged on parameters such as line, angle, fluidity and commitment and assigned a numerical score up to 100. These scores are then ranked to determine the qualifying classification and hence populate the brackets for the competition phase. 2022 sees the return of championship points being awarded for qualifying: the top qualifier is awarded three points, the second-placed qualifier two points and the third-placed qualifier one point.

The qualifiers proceed through a series of competition heats, with those eliminated in the first round (Top 32) receiving 35 points and classifying 17th through 32nd, the second round (Top 16) receiving 52 points and classifying 9th through 16th, the third round (Great 8) receiving 67 points and classifying 5th through 8th, and the fourth round (Final Four) receiving 80 points and classifying 3rd and 4th. In the Final, the runner-up receives 91 points and the winner 100 points. Final classification within each round is then determined by highest qualifying position; for example, of the two drivers eliminated in the Final Four, the driver who qualified higher is awarded 3rd position and the final place on the podium.

If 22 or fewer drivers are present, an alternative qualifying format is used in which a Last Chance Bracket (LCB) is populated by the drivers who qualify from 15th down. The top two LCB qualifiers enter the competition heats as normal, while the remaining LCB qualifiers (3rd down to a maximum of 8th if 22 drivers are present) receive 35 points, equivalent to the 17th–32nd positions at a regular event.

In the event of a tie on points at the end of the season, the driver who classified higher in the most recent round will be awarded the higher position.

Qualifying stage

Competition stage

Pro Championship standings

Auto Cup standings
Auto Cup points are awarded each round to the two drivers with the highest classified finish for each manufacturer. To be eligible, both the chassis and engine must have been constructed by that manufacturer.

Tire Cup standings
Tire Cup points are awarded each round to the two drivers with the highest classified finish for each tire manufacturer.

Footnotes

References

Formula D seasons
Formula D